Theodore Cottrell may refer to:

Ted Cottrell (born 1947), American football coach and former player
T. J. Cottrell (born 1982), American former football tight end